The SS Gairsoppa was a British steam merchant ship built in Jarrow and launched in 1919.  After a long civilian career, she saw service during the Second World War. She was named after the town of Gerusoppa on the banks of River Sharavati in Karnataka, India, which due to its easy access to water transportation and as a distribution centre for crops including pepper, was the commercial capital for centuries.

She sailed with several convoys, before joining Convoy SL 64 in February 1941. Gairsoppa left the convoy when she exhausted the majority of her fuel and was making her way to Galway, Ireland, when a German U-boat fired a torpedo that sank her with the loss of 85 lives.

The wreck of the Gairsoppa was discovered in 2011, and it was announced that an operation to recover its cargo of silver bullion, with an estimated value of £150 million, would begin in 2012.  On 18July 2013 Odyssey Marine Exploration, of Tampa, Florida, US, reported that it had recovered 110 tons of silver.

Description
She was propelled by a 517 nhp triple expansion steam engine driving a single screw propeller. The engine was built by Palmers.

Career
Ordered by the British Shipping Controller as SS War Roebuck from Palmers Shipbuilding and Iron Company of Jarrow, she was taken over during construction by the British-India Steam Navigation Company, and completed as SS Gairsoppa. Gairsoppa was completed in November 1919. Her port of registry was Glasgow. She was allocated the United Kingdom Official Number 141924. On 29 April 1930, she ran aground at Fulta Point, India. She was refloated undamaged later that day. Gairsoppa used the Code Letters GCZB from 1934.

Sinking
Attached to convoy SL-64 under master Gerald Hyland, she was returning from India to Britain in 1941 with a cargo of silver ingots destined for the Royal Mint, pig iron and tea. She joined the 8 knot convoy in Freetown, Sierra Leone, but while in a heavy storm and running low on coal off the coast of neutral Ireland, Gairsoppa split off from the convoy and set course for Galway harbour at a reduced speed of 5 knots.

A German Focke-Wulf Fw 200 aircraft circled her at 08:00 on 16 February, and at 22:30,  under the command of Ernst Mengersen, spotted her. Torpedoed on the starboard side in No. 2 hold, she sank within 20 minutes (Note: German logbooks kept in German time state she sank at 00:08 on 17 February 1941), claiming the lives of 85 people.

It was thought that three lifeboats launched, but only one in the charge of the second officer, R. H. Ayres, with four Europeans and two Lascars on board, made it away; the rest of the crew was lost.  By the 13th day only the second officer, the radio officer, and one seaman gunner remained alive.  Ayres and his boat reached the Cornish coast two weeks later at Caerthillian Cove in the parish of Landewednack.  The boat capsized before the Lizard lifeboat could reach them, and only the second officer was pulled from the sea alive.  Two of the men aboard, Robert Frederick Hampshire (Radio Officer), and an unknown Indian seaman, died trying to get ashore.  They are buried at St Wynwallow's, Church Cove, Landewednack. Ayres was appointed a Member of the Order of the British Empire (MBE) for his attempts to rescue his fellow sailors; he lived until 1992.

Memorial
The eleven crew members who died are commemorated on the 51st panel of the Tower Hill Memorial, and the seventy lascars who did not survive the Gairsoppa'''s sinking are commemorated on the Chittagong War Memorial.

Recovery

On 26 September 2011, Odyssey Marine confirmed the identity and location of the Gairsoppa'' after less than two months of searching. Footage of the wreck was provided by the company on 26 September 2011 and published on the NYTimes.com website. Odyssey Marine believes the site contains a residual 1,599 insured silver ingots and an unknown, possibly substantial, amount of uninsured silver. Odyssey will retain 80% of the value of any recovered cargo, with the remainder going to HM Treasury. On 23 July 2013 it was reported that a total of 61 tons of silver bullion had been recovered from the wreckage, with an estimated value of £137 million.

In 2014 the Royal Mint issued 20,000 commemorative Quarter Ounce Britannia coins, each coin struck with a denomination of 50p, using a portion of the silver recovered.

References

External links

Gairsoppa at convoy web
Gairsoppa at Shipwrecks UK
WW II shipwreck pays off $210 million in silver for US salvagers
Details of exhibition on material recovered from the Gairsoppa 
 https://www.postalmuseum.org/discover/attractions/voices-from-the-deep/

1919 ships
Maritime incidents in 1930
Maritime incidents in February 1941
Ministry of War Transport ships
Ships of the British India Steam Navigation Company
Ships sunk by German submarines in World War II
Standard World War I ships
Steamships of the United Kingdom
Treasure from shipwrecks
Ships built on the River Tyne
World War II merchant ships of the United Kingdom
World War II shipwrecks in the Atlantic Ocean